= Praça do Carmo =

Square in Rio de Janeiro

Coordinates: 22°50′22″S 43°17′46″W

Praça do Carmo is a region of Rio de Janeiro, but not officially recognized as a neighborhood.
